The Skaergaard intrusion is a layered igneous intrusion in the Kangerlussuaq area, East Greenland. It comprises various rock types including gabbro, ferro diorite, anorthosite and granophyre.  

Discovered by Lawrence Wager
in 1931 during the British Arctic Air Route Expedition led by Gino Watkins, the intrusion has been important to the development of key concepts in igneous petrology, including magma differentiation and fractional crystallisation
and the development of layering.
The Skaergaard intrusion formed when tholeiitic magma was emplaced about 55 million years ago,
during the initial opening of the North Atlantic Ocean. The body represents essentially a single pulse of magma, which crystallized from the bottom upward and the top downward. The intrusion is characterized by exceptionally well-developed cumulate layering defined by variations in the abundance of crystallizing olivine, pyroxene, plagioclase and magnetite. 

The Skaergaard is perhaps the simplest and smallest of a group of gabbroic complexes of similar age that occur along the central coast of East Greenland, which together with coeval flood basalts are part of the North Atlantic large igneous province.

See also
Skaergaardite

References

External links
 The (virtual) Skaergaard Intrusion

Geology of Greenland
Arctic research
Layered intrusions
Paleogene magmatism